Dotties Pick (1952–1980) was a champion Standardbred pacing horse. She was by Adios and out of Pick Up.

Dotties Pick was bred in Ontario, Canada. She compiled a then-record of 42 wins, 27 seconds and 13 thirds and earnings of $263,978 in a four-year campaign. She was the first pacing mare to top $100,000 in a single season.

Dotties Pick was inducted into the Canadian Horse Racing Hall of Fame in 1976, thirteen years before her brother Adios Pick.

References
 Dottie's Pick's page at the Canadian Horse Racing Hall of Fame

See also
Harness racing

1952 racehorse births
1980 racehorse deaths
Racehorses bred in Ontario
Canadian Standardbred racehorses
Canadian Horse Racing Hall of Fame inductees
United States Harness Racing Hall of Fame inductees